The Barrier Ranges or sometimes the Barrier Range and historically the Stanley's Barrier Range, is a mountain range that comprises a series of hills and higher grounds in the far western region of New South Wales, Australia, surrounding the city of Broken Hill.

Location and features
The Barrier Ranges comprise the whole system of ranges and ridges associated with the main watershed named the Main Barrier Range - including Coko Range, Floods Range, Slate Range, Robe Range, Mundi Mundi Range, Coonbaralba Range and Mount Darling Range. The city of Broken Hill lies within these ranges.

The ranges is oriented in a roughly north-south direction, east of the border between New South Wales and South Australia. It is an area of slightly higher ground lying between the lower lands along the Darling River,  and lower ground in South Australia.  The Barrier Ranges contains a number of mineral deposits, most notably Broken Hill.

It was reported in October 1856 that, 'within the last year or two numerous sheep-stations have been opened in the Barrier Ranges, affording a reasonable prospect, not only of increased pastoral wealth, but also of the gradual development of the mineral resources of the district and its ultimate settlement.'

Etymology
The name of the Barrier Highway and various local organisations in Broken Hill including the word 'barrier', are derived from the name of this range. In 1844, during his third and final expedition, Charles Sturt named the range Stanley's Barrier Range in honour of Lord Stanley.

See also

 List of mountains in New South Wales

References

Mountain ranges of New South Wales